Proteomes is a peer-reviewed open access scientific journal covering research in biochemistry and molecular biology, and focused on proteome analysis. It is published by MDPI and was established in 2013. The joint editor-in-chief are Jens R. Coorssen (Brock University) and Matthew P. Padula (University of Technology Sydney)

Archiving and Indexing 
The journal is covered by the following databases and archives:

References

External links 

 
 Twitter

MDPI academic journals
Open access journals
English-language journals